Peabody Award winners and honorable mentions.

1950

1951

1952

1953

1954

1955

1956

1957

1958

1959

Notes

 List1950